On the Cover, an extended play by the American punk band MxPx
 On the Cover, a 2004 game show broadcast on the former PAX network; see List of programs broadcast by Ion Television